John Galliard may refer to:

Johann Ernst Galliard, an eighteenth-century German composer
Sir John Galliard, the protagonist of Mary Davys's The Accomplished Rake (1727)